The MaK G 1203 BB is a type of four axle B'B' off-centre cab locomotive  built by Maschinenbau Kiel.

Design and operations
The locomotive is an updated version of the MaK G 1201 BB with a MTU 396 engine replacing the MTU 333 engine. The hydrodynamic converter remained the same, a Voith L4r4zU2.

The locomotive design is similar to the MaK G 1202 BB and MaK G 1204 BB but with an eight-cylinder V engine instead of the twelve-cylinder engines on the higher-powered locomotives; the external dimensions of are identical, and the appearance very similar.

Nineteen locomotives were built for private railways of Germany (and Austria), including Seehafen Kiel (Port of Kiel), and the Klockner steel works (now ArcelorMittal Bremen).

Gabon locomotives
Six locomotives were built in 1984 for the railways of Gabon (Office du chemin de fer transgabonais) or OCTRA, with Cummins engines instead of MTU engines. They received numbers "BB 531" to "BB 536"

References

External links

Images: 

MaK locomotives
Standard gauge locomotives of Gabon
Railway locomotives introduced in 1982